Helen Hull Jacobs (August 6, 1908 – June 2, 1997) was an American tennis player who won nine Grand Slam titles. In 1936 she was ranked No. 1 in singles by A. Wallis Myers.

Early life
Jacobs was born in Globe, Arizona, and was Jewish. Her parents, Roland (a mining executive, and then a newspaper advertising executive) and Eula Jacobs, moved the family to San Francisco in 1914. She was the best-known Jewish female player of the interwar period.

Tennis career 
Jacobs had a powerful serve and overhead smash and a sound backhand, but she never learned to hit a flat forehand, despite her friendship with, and some coaching from, Bill Tilden. Like both her Wightman Cup coach Hazel Hotchkiss Wightman and her archrival Helen Wills Moody, she grew up in Berkeley, California, learned the game at the Berkeley Tennis Club, pursued her undergraduate degree at the University of California, Berkeley, and was inducted into the Cal Sports Hall of Fame.

Jacobs won five Grand Slam singles titles and was an eleven-time Grand Slam singles runner-up. Six of those losses were to Helen Wills Moody. Jacobs's only victory over Moody was in the final of the 1933 U.S. Championships. Moody retired from the match with a back injury while trailing 3–0 in the third set to a chorus of boos from the audience who believed that Moody quit the match merely to deny Jacobs the satisfaction of finishing out her victory. It was reported by many witnesses after the match that Moody still planned to play her doubles match later that afternoon but was advised against it. Years later, Moody confirmed her injury, saying, "My back is kind of funny. The vertebra between the fourth and fifth disk is thin. When the disk slips around, it's intolerable. It rained the whole week before that final match. I lay in bed, and that was bad because it stiffened worse. I just couldn't play any longer, but I didn't say anything because it would look like an excuse." Jacobs almost defeated Moody again when she had match point at 6–3, 3–6, 5–3 in the 1935 Wimbledon Championships singles final but a mishit on a short lob, which she decided to let bounce, cost her the point and four games later the match. In the 1938 Wimbledon final against Moody, Jacobs turned her ankle at 4–4 in the first set and hobbled around the court for the remainder of the match, with Moody winning the final eight games and the second set lasting a mere eight minutes. When asked after the match why she did not accept Hazel Wightman's on-court advice to quit the match after the injury, Jacobs said that continuing was the sporting thing to do so that Moody could enjoy the full taste of victory, an obvious allusion to Moody's retirement from the 1933 U.S. final. Moody said, "I was very sorry about Helen's ankle. But it couldn't be helped, could it? I thought there was nothing I could do but get it over as quickly as possible." In total, Jacobs lost 14 of the 15 career singles matches she played against Moody.

Jacobs won three Grand Slam women's doubles titles and one in mixed doubles. She was the runner-up at six Grand Slam women's doubles tournaments and one Grand Slam mixed doubles tournament. She won the singles and women's doubles titles at the Italian Championships in 1934.

According to A. Wallis Myers and John Olliff of The Daily Telegraph and the Daily Mail, Jacobs was ranked in the world top 10 from 1928 through 1939 (no rankings issued from 1940 through 1945), reaching a career high of World No. 1 in those rankings in 1936. With the exceptions of 1930 and 1938, Jacobs was included in the year-end top 10 rankings by the United States Tennis Association from 1927 through 1941. She was the top-ranked U.S. player from 1932 through 1935.

Jacobs was a member of the U.S. Wightman Cup team from 1927 through 1937 and again in 1939. Her lifetime record was 19–11.

In 1933, Jacobs became the first woman to break with tradition by wearing man-tailored shorts at Wimbledon.

While she was still playing tennis, Jacobs became a writer. Her first books were Modern Tennis (1933) and Improve Your Tennis (1936). She also wrote fictional works, such as Storm Against the Wind (1944). Her autobiography Beyond the Game appeared in 1936. In 1949, she published Gallery of Champions, a collection of biographies of female players, which she dedicated to Molla Mallory.

Honors and awards 
Jacobs was named Associated Press Female Athlete of the Year in 1933. She was inducted into the International Tennis Hall of Fame in 1962. In 2015, she was inducted into the National Gay and Lesbian Sports Hall of Fame.

World War II and personal life 

Jacobs served as a commander in the U.S. Navy intelligence during World War II, one of only five women to achieve that rank in the Navy.

Long known to have been lesbian, she was in a relationship from 1934 to 1943 with Henrietta Bingham, daughter of Louisville publisher and ambassador to England Robert Bingham. Her partner in later life was Virginia Gurnee. Jacobs died of heart failure in East Hampton, New York on June 2, 1997, where she had been living.

Grand Slam finals

Singles (5 titles, 11 runners-up)

Women's doubles (3 titles, 6 runner-ups)

Mixed doubles (1 title, 1 runner-up)

Grand Slam singles tournament timeline

R = tournament restricted to French nationals and held under German occupation.

Bibliography
 Modern Tennis  (1933)
 Improve Your Tennis (1936) 
 Beyond the game: an autobiography (1936)
 "By your leave, sir" : the story of a WAVE (1943)
 Storm Against the Wind (1944) 
 Laurel for Judy (1945)
 Adventure in Blue Jeans (1947)
 Gallery of Champions (1949)
 Center Court (1950)
 Proudly she serves! The realistic story of a tennis champion who becomes a Wave (1953)
 The young sportsman's guide to tennis (1961)
 Beginner's Guide to Winning Tennis (1961)
 Judy, Tennis Ace (1961)
 Better physical fitness for girls (1964)
 Courage to Conquer (1967)
 The Tennis Machine (1972)
 Famous modern American women athletes (1975)

See also 
 Performance timelines for all female tennis players who reached at least one Grand Slam final
List of select Jewish tennis players

References

External links
 
 Intercollegiate Tennis Association Hall of Fame – Helen Hull Jacobs

1908 births
1997 deaths
American female tennis players
California Golden Bears women's tennis players
American LGBT sportspeople
Sportspeople from Berkeley, California
People from East Hampton (town), New York
People from Globe, Arizona
International Tennis Hall of Fame inductees
Tennis people from Arizona
Tennis people from California
Jewish American sportspeople
Jewish tennis players
United States National champions (tennis)
Wimbledon champions (pre-Open Era)
Lesbian sportswomen
LGBT people from Arizona
LGBT tennis players
Grand Slam (tennis) champions in women's singles
Grand Slam (tennis) champions in women's doubles
Grand Slam (tennis) champions in mixed doubles
Tennis writers
20th-century American women
20th-century American people
20th-century American Jews
World number 1 ranked female tennis players
20th-century American LGBT people